Iulian Arhire (born 17 March 1976 in Galaţi) is a Romanian professional footballer who played as a midfielder.

Club career
Arhire began his career at Constant Galaţi. He made his debut in the Romanian Liga I on 4 March 1995, for Oțelul Galați against rivals from Inter Sibiu. He also played for Pohang Steelers, Alania Vladikavkaz, Zimbru Chişinău, Dinamo București, Metalurh Donetsk, Volyn Lutsk, Politehnica Iaşi, Unirea Urziceni and Gloria Bistriţa.

References

External links
 
 
 

1976 births
Living people
Sportspeople from Galați
Romanian footballers
ASC Oțelul Galați players
Pohang Steelers players
FC Spartak Vladikavkaz players
FC Zimbru Chișinău players
FC Dinamo București players
FC Metalurh Donetsk players
FC Volyn Lutsk players
FC Politehnica Iași (1945) players
FC Unirea Urziceni players
ACF Gloria Bistrița players
Liga I players
K League 1 players
Russian Premier League players
Ukrainian Premier League players
Romanian expatriate footballers
Expatriate footballers in Russia
Romanian expatriate sportspeople in Russia
Expatriate footballers in South Korea
Romanian expatriate sportspeople in South Korea
Expatriate footballers in Ukraine
Romanian expatriate sportspeople in Ukraine
Expatriate footballers in Moldova
Association football midfielders